Garfield: Big Fat Hairy Deal is a 1987 computer game for the Atari ST, ZX Spectrum, Commodore 64, Amstrad CPC and the Amiga based on the comic strip Garfield. It is the second video game based on Jim Davis' Garfield comics to be released, following 1986's Create with Garfield.

Plot and gameplay
Garfield must rescue his girlfriend Arlene from the cat pound and then return to Jon Arbuckle's map. He starts his quest in Jon's house, venturing through streets, dark alleys, convalescent homes, and sanitary sewers to find Arlene. Various objects are littered along the way, and Garfield meets characters such as Odie, Nermal and giant rats, whom can help or hinder his quest.

In some versions of this game, the background graphics are only in black and white, while the sprites show a little color. In other versions (i.e. the Commodore 64 version), the graphics are all full color.

Reception

Zzap!64 reviewing the C64 version complemented the graphics, practically the characters, calling them "Large, beautifully animated", but criticised the repetitive level design and lack of replay value.

Nic Outterside writing in  Atari ST User found that the game had "you in stitches of laughter", employed "suburb graphics and animation", was "a delight to play" and thought it was one of the most enjoyable games he had played in 1988.

References

External links
 
 
  at the Hall of Light (HOL)

1987 video games
Amiga games
Amstrad CPC games
Atari ST games
Commodore 64 games
Video games based on Garfield
Platform games
Video games scored by David Whittaker
Video games developed in the United Kingdom
ZX Spectrum games